Fort Knox Five is a Washington, D.C.-based musical group consisting of Steve Raskin, Jon Horvath, Rob Myers and Sid Barcelona. The musical collective releases music through their self-run label, Fort Knox Recordings. Their music style mixes elements of funk, reggae, hip hop, and electronica.

History
Fort Knox Five was formed in 2003 by four like-minded musicians as an outlet for a new style of funk-infused electronic music. The group chose their name "because our studio has always been called Fort Knox," though there were only four members in the group. Members hail from various side projects and previous outfits; Steve Raskin originally part of Edsel and Raskal as well as ESL Music Recording Artists Liftoff and Thunderball, Rob Myers plays sitar and guitar with Thievery Corporation and International Velvet and also plays guitar in See-I, Jon Horvath recorded music with both DJ Dan and Raskal, and Sid Barcelona was also a part of ESL Music Recording Artists Liftoff and Thunderball. Fort Knox Five formed their record label, Fort Knox Recordings to release their music, and the label is now distributed by Washington, DC-based Dischord Records.

In 2005, Fort Knox Five were selected to be the opening DJs on Gwen Stefani's Harajuku Lovers Tour throughout North America, playing numerous shows alongside Stefani and The Black Eyed Peas. Fort Knox Five were also selected by Urb Magazine for their annual "Next 100" artists to watch.

In 2007, Fort Knox Five were selected to remix two Bob Marley songs which were released on Roots, Rock, and Remixed. Fort Knox Five were also selected as the resident DJs at the Eye Candy Sound Lounge at the Mandalay Bay Resort and Casino in Las Vegas.

In 2008, Fort Knox Five released their debut studio album Radio Free DC which features all four members of Fort Knox Five on production as well as numerous guest vocalists and musicians.

In 2009, Fort Knox Five began the year with a tour of Australia. This was followed by Fort Knox Recordings hosting a special inaugural event called The Funk 4 Peace Ball which featured Afrika Bambaataa, Fort Knox Five, 2Tuff , and Nappy Riddem. EA released its Skate 2 video game in January, which featured Fort Knox Five songs on the game soundtrack. Fort Knox Five also released Volume 1 of Radio Free DC Remixed in February 2009.

Member Jon Horvath died on August 21, 2015.

in 2020, Fort Knox Five received the WAMMIES (Washington Area Music Award) for Best Electronic/Techno Artist or Group

Discography

Albums 
Radio Free DC (2008)
Pressurize the Cabin (2015)

Singles and EPs
Dodge City Rockers (2003)
The Big Score (2003)
Blowing Up The Barrio (2004)
The Brazilian Hipster (2004)
Radio Free DC (2005)
The Spirit of '75 (2007)
Bob Marley Remixed (2007)
Radio Free DC Remixed Vol 1 (2009)
Radio Free DC Remixed Vol 2 (2009)
Radio Free DC Remixed Vol 3 (2009)
Radio Free DC Remixed Vol 4 (2009)
Radio Free DC Remixed Vol 5 (2009)
Radio Free DC Remixed Vol 6 (2009)
Radio Free DC Remixed Vol 7 (2009)
Radio Free DC Remixed Vol 8 (2009)
Radio Free DC Remixed Vol 9 (2009)
Radio Free DC Remixed Vol 10 (2009)
The New Gold Standard Vol 2 (2010)
Shift Remixed EP (2010)
Bhangra Paanch Remixed EP (2010)

Compilations
The New Gold Standard (2006)
Reminted (2007)
Radio Free DC Remixed (2009)
The New Gold Standard 2 (2010)
10 Years of Fort Knox Five (2013)

Remixes
 Rodney Hunter - Electric Lady (2004)
 Dr. Rubberfunk - The Owner (2004)
 Dynamo Productions - Get It Together (2004)
 Jeff Settle - The Whistle Song (2005)
 Tower of Power - This Type of Funk (2005)
 Mo' Horizons - Drum 'n' Boogaloo (2005)
 Rex Riddem - Salvador Diaspora (2005)
 Torpedo Boyz - Are You Talking To Me!?? (2005)
 Kraak & Smaak - One of These Days (2006)
 Chris Joss - Wrong Alley Street (2006)
 A Skillz & Krafty Kuts - Ain't It Funky (2006)
 Tito Puente - Ran Kan Kan (2006)
 Deborah Bond - Don't Waste Your Time (2006)
 Nickodemus - Give the Drummer Some (2006)
 Skeewiff - Now I'm Living For Me (2006)
 Sulphonic Soundsystem - Catalina Sunset (2006)
 Louis Armstrong - Jeepers Creepers (2007)
 Joe Bataan - The Fool (2007)
 Malente - Open Secret (2007)
 Ancient Astronauts - 36 Hours (2007)
 Thunderball - Strictly Rudeboy (2007)
 Afrika Bambataa - Got That Vibe/Just A Smoke (2007)
 Ursula 1000 - Electric Boogie (2007)
 Bob Marley - Duppy Conqueror (2007)
 Bob Marley - Soul Shakedown Party(2007)
 Dust Galaxy - Here Come The Trumpets (2007)
 Bitter: Sweet - Salty Air (2007)
 Watch TV & The Primetime - Voodoo Royale (2007)
 Thunderball – Strictly Rudeboy feat Rootz & Zeebo(2007)
 All Good Funk Alliance – NY Funk (2009)
 Sub Swara – The Balance (2009)
 Deekline & Wizard – Bounce & Rebound(2009)
 All Good Funk Alliance – Man With A Jam Plan (2009)
 Kraak & Smaak – Ain’t Gonna Take It(2009) 
 Nick Thayer – Let it Go (2010)
 BadBoe – Funk In The Air (2010)
 Scott Hardkiss – Beat Freak (2010)
 Thunderball – Moon On The Rise (2010)
 DJ Love – Zigga Zigga (2011)
 Fuzzbox Inc – Party People(2011)
 Ursula 1000 – Hey You (2011)
 Empresarios - Space Selecta (2011)
 See-I – Haterz 24/7 (2011)
 Shawn Lee & AM – Somebody Like You (2012)
 Superpendejos – La Princesa De La Cumbia (2012)
 Nappy Riddem – Devil Needs A Bodyguard (2012)
 All Good Funk Alliance – Mr. Hipnoid (2012)
 Opiuo – Wiggle Sticks(2012)
 Empresarios – Maria Juana (2013)
 Queen – Bohemian Rhapsody (2014)

Music Videos
 Shift - released July 2010.
SHIFT MUSIC VIDEO: https://www.youtube.com/watch?v=OyyK_Y9njgQ
Directed by Stu MacKay-Smith & Travis Tetreault
Animator/Editor: Stu MacKay-Smith
Producer/Assistant Director: Travis Tetreault
Associate Producer: Jon Horvath
Director Of Photography: Christian Begin
Stunt coordinator: Jason Hardabura
Additional cinematography by JMO, Adam MacKay-Smith, Colin McGreal & Robin Bell.
Featuring Afrika Bambaataa, Mustafa Akbar, Fort Knox Five, The Now or Never Crew, Hybrid Movement Crew, Nessa V, Jina Anika & Foxy Moron
Filmed on location in Vancouver, BC – New York, NY – Washington, DC

Featuring artists
Fort Knox Five works with various vocalists and musicians to add a live element to their music. The featured artists they have worked with include:

 Afrika Bambaataa
 Asheru
 Ian Svenonius
 Mustafa Akbar
 Members of See-I
 Sleepy Wonder
 Miss Johnna M

Media Licensing
 Brazilian Hipster - Hôtel Costes, Vol. 7
 Brazilian Hipster - The Cove (film)
 Blowing Up on the Spot- Tiger Woods PGA Tour 07
 Insight - Need for Speed: Shift
 Insight - Fringe (season 1) Episode 12
 King of the Street - Skate It
 We Don't Stop Yawl - NBA Live 10
 Insight - Test Drive Unlimited 2
 Insight - Dirt 3
 Funk 4 Peace'' - Test Drive Unlimited 2

External links
 Official Website
 Fort Knox Five Official Myspace Site
 Fort Knox Five Official Facebook Page
 The Fort Knox Five Discography
 Guardian UK New Band of the Day No. 393, story by Paul Lester
 Properly Chilled Fort Knox Five Interview
 Adelaide (Australia) Review of Fort Knox Five

References

American hip hop groups
Electronic music groups from Washington, D.C.